Luanda is the capital and most-populous city in Angola.

Luanda may also refer to:
Luanda, Kenya, a town in Kenya
Luan Da, mystic of the Han Dynasty